"Evil Hearted You" is a 1965 song by English rock group the Yardbirds.  It was written by future 10cc member Graham Gouldman, who also wrote the group's two prior singles, "For Your Love" and "Heart Full of Soul". It reached No. 3 on the main UK singles chart.

Recording and releases
The Yardbirds recorded the song at Advision Studios, London, on 23August 1965. When it was released 1October 1965 in the UK, "Evil Hearted You", along with the second side, "Still I'm Sad" became a double A-side hit.  The Record Retailer singles chart counted both sides and reported it reached number three.  The NME singles chart reported the two songs separately – "Evil Hearted You" at number ten and "Still I'm Sad" at number nine.  There was no single release in the US, but the song was included on Having a Rave Up, which was released 15November 1965.

Reception
Music critic Cub Koda describes the song as a "minor-key pop classic" and guitarist Jeff Beck's solo as "equal parts classical and James Bond soundtrack".

In a review for AllMusic, Richie Unterberger called the song "one of the gloomiest hit singles in all of 1960s British rock" and adds:

Other versions
"Evil Hearted You" was recorded by the American group the Human Beinz, prior to changing their name. Unterberger describes it as "a faithful version".

Notes

References

1965 songs
1965 singles
The Yardbirds songs
Songs written by Graham Gouldman
Columbia Graphophone Company singles